OCCI may refer to:

Online Civil Courage Initiative, a partnership between the Institute for Strategic Dialogue and Facebook 
Ontario Case Costing Initiative, see Canadian Institute for Health Information
Ontario Consortium for Cardiac Imaging, a project of Sunnybrook Research Institute
Open Cloud Computing Interface, an open protocol for cloud computing
Oracle C++ Call Interface, a proprietary database API
 Osaka Chamber of Commerce and Industry; see Inabata Katsutaro